Final results for the water polo tournament at the 1948 Summer Olympics played at Finchley Lido.

Medal summary

Team squads

Results

Round One

In the first round each team in a group played each other team in the same group. The placings were determined on points. If the points were equal, then the better goal average decided. The first two teams of each group were qualified for the second round, while the third placed team was eliminated.

Group A

Group B

Group C

Group D

Group E

Group F

Round Two

In the second round each team in a group played each other team in the same group unless they had met in a previous round. In this case the previous result stood and was carried forward to this group. So in each group only three matches had to be played. The placings were determined on points. If the points were equal, then the better goal average decided. The first two teams of each group were qualified for the semi-finals, while the third placed team was eliminated.

The results which are carried forward from the first round are shown in italics.

Group G

Group H

Group I

Group J

Semi-finals

As in the second round each team in a group played each other team in the same group unless they had met in a previous round. In this case the previous result stood and was carried forward to this group. So in each group only three matches had to be played. The placings were determined on points. If the points were equal, then the better goal average decided. The first two teams of each group were qualified for the final round, while the third and fourth placed team were eliminated and took part in a consolation tournament.

The results which are carried forward from the previous rounds are shown in italics.

Group K

Group L

Final round

As in all other rounds each team in the final played each other team unless they had met in a previous round. In this case the previous result stood and was carried forward to the final. So in the final only four matches had to be played. The placings were determined on points. If the points were equal, then the better goal average decided.

The results which are carried forward from the previous rounds are shown in italics.

Final Group

Group for fifth to eighth places - consolation tournament

Participating nations
Each country was allowed to enter a team of 11 players and they all were eligible for participation.

A total of 155(*) water polo players from 18 nations competed at the London Games:

 
 
 
 
 
 
 
 
 
 
 
 
 
 
 
 
 
 

(*) NOTE: There are only players counted, which participated in one game at least.

Not all reserve players are known.

Summary

References

Sources
 PDF documents in the LA84 Foundation Digital Library:
 Official Report of the 1948 Olympic Games (download, archive) (pp. 537–540, 640–647)
 Water polo on the Olympedia website
 Water polo at the 1948 Summer Olympics (men's tournament)
 Water polo on the Sports Reference website
 Water polo at the 1948 Summer Games (men's tournament) (archived)

 
1948 Summer Olympics events
1948
Water sports in London
1948 in water polo
1948